The Pacific Coast Ranges (officially gazetted as the Pacific Mountain System in the United States) are the series of mountain ranges that stretch along the West Coast of North America from Alaska south to Northern and Central Mexico. Although they are commonly thought to be the westernmost mountain range of the continental United States and Canada, the geologically distinct Insular Mountains of Vancouver Island lie farther west.

The Pacific Coast Ranges are part of the North American Cordillera (sometimes known as the Western Cordillera, or in Canada, as the Pacific Cordillera and/or the Canadian Cordillera), which includes the Rocky Mountains, the Columbia Mountains, the Interior Mountains, the Interior Plateau, the Sierra Nevada, the Great Basin mountain ranges, and other ranges and various plateaus and basins.

The Pacific Coast Ranges designation, however, only applies to the Western System of the Western Cordillera, which comprises the Saint Elias Mountains, Coast Mountains, Insular Mountains, Olympic Mountains, Cascade Range, Oregon Coast Range, California Coast Ranges, Transverse Ranges, Peninsular Ranges, and the Sierra Madre Occidental.

Other uses
The term Coast Range is used by the United States Geological Survey to refer only to the ranges south of the Strait of Juan de Fuca in Washington to the California-Mexico border, and to those west of Puget Sound, the Willamette Valley, and the Sacramento and San Joaquin valleys (the California Central Valley).
That definition excludes the Sierra Nevada and Cascade Ranges, the Mojave (High), and Sonoran (Low) Deserts, i.e. the Pacific Border province. The same term is used informally in Canada to refer to the Coast Mountains and adjoining inland ranges such as the Hazelton Mountains, and sometimes also the Saint Elias Mountains.

Geography
The character of the ranges varies considerably, from the record-setting tidewater glaciers in the ranges of Alaska, to the rugged Central and Southern California ranges, the Transverse Ranges and Peninsular Ranges, in the chaparral and woodlands eco-region with Oak Woodland, Chaparral shrub forest or Coastal sage scrub-covering them. The coastline is often seen dropping steeply into the sea with photogenic views. Along the British Columbia and Alaska coast, the mountains intermix with the sea in a complex maze of fjords, with thousands of islands.

There are coastal plains at the mouths of rivers that have punched through the mountains spreading sediments, most notably at the Copper River in Alaska, the Fraser River in British Columbia, and the Columbia River between Washington and Oregon. In California: the Sacramento and San Joaquin Rivers' San Francisco Bay, the Santa Clara River's Oxnard Plain, the Los Angeles, San Gabriel, and Santa Ana Rivers' Los Angeles Basina coastal sediment-filled plain between the peninsular and transverse ranges with sediment in the basin up to 6 miles (10 km) deep, and the San Diego River's Mission Bay.

From the vicinity of San Francisco Bay north, it is common in winter for cool unstable air masses from the Gulf of Alaska to make landfall in one of the Coast Ranges, resulting in heavy precipitation, both as rain and snow, especially on their western slopes. The same Winter weather occurs with less frequency and precipitation in Southern California, with the mountains' western faces and peaks causing an eastward rainshadow that produces the arid desert regions.

Omitted from the list below, but often included is the Sierra Nevada, a major mountain range of eastern California that is separated by the Central Valley over much of its length from the California Coast Ranges and the Transverse Ranges.

Geology
On the West coast of North America, the coast ranges and the coastal plain form the margin. Most of the land is made of terranes that have been accreted onto the margin. In the north, the insular belt is an accreted terrane, forming the margin. This belt extends from the Wrangellia Terrane in Alaska to the Chilliwack group of Canada.

A rupture in Rodinia 750 million years ago formed a passive margin in the eastern Pacific Northwest. The breakup of Pangea 200 million years ago began the westward movement of the North American plate, creating an active margin on the western continent. As the continent drifted West, terranes were accreted onto the west coast. The timing of the accretion of the insular belt is uncertain, although the closure did not occur until at least 115 million years ago. Other Mesozoic terranes that accreted onto the continent include the Klamath Mountains, the Sierra Nevada, and the Guerrero super-terrane of western Mexico. 90–80 million years ago the subducting Farallon plate split and formed the Kula Plate to the North. This formed an area in what is now Northern California, where the plates converged forming a Mélange. North of this was the Columbia Embayment, where the continental margin was east of the surrounding areas. Many of the major batholiths date from the late Cretaceous. As the Laramide Orogeny ended around 48 million years ago, the accretion of the Siletzia terrane began in the Pacific Northwest. This began the volcanic activity in the Cascadia subduction zone, forming the modern Cascade Range, and lasted into the Miocene. Events here may relate to the ignimbrite flare-up of the southern Basin and Range. As extension in the Basin and Range Province slowed by a change in North American Plate movement circa 7 to 8 Million years ago, rifting began on the Gulf of California.

Although many of the ranges do share a common geologic history, the Pacific Coast Ranges province is not defined by geology, but rather by geography. Many of the various ranges are composed of distinct forms of rock from many different periods of geological time from the Precambrian in parts of the Little San Bernardino Mountains to 10,000-year-old rock in the Cascade Range. For one example, the Peninsular Ranges, composed of Mesozoic batholitic rock, are geologically extremely different from the San Bernardino Mountains, composed of a mix of Precambrian metamorphic rock and Cenozoic sedimentary rock. However, both are considered part of the Pacific Coast Ranges due to their proximity and similar economic and social impact on surrounding communities.

Major ranges
These are the members of the Pacific Coast Ranges, from north to south:
Kenai Mountains, southern Alaska
Chugach Mountains, southern Alaska
Talkeetna Mountains, southern Alaska

Yukon Ranges, Alaska, Yukon
Wrangell Mountains, southern Alaska
Saint Elias Mountains, southern Alaska, southwestern Yukon, far northwestern British Columbia
Alsek Ranges
Fairweather Range
Takshanuk Mountains, Haines, Alaska-area. Between Chilkat and Chilkoot watersheds
Coast Mountains
Boundary Ranges, southeastern Alaska, northwestern British Columbia
Cheja Range (southeast of Taku/Whiting Rivers)
Chechidla Range
Chutine Icefield
Adam Mountains
Ashington Range
Burniston Range
Dezadeash Range
Florence Range
Halleck Range
Juneau Icefield
Kakuhan Range
Lincoln Mountains
Longview Range
Peabody Mountains
Rousseau Range
Seward Mountains
Snowslide Range
Spectrum Range
Stikine Icecap
Kitimat Ranges BC North Coast
Pacific Ranges BC South & Central Coast
Rainbow Range northwest Chilcotin, also classifiable as part of the Interior Plateau
Pantheon Range Homathko area
Niut Range Homathko area
Waddington Range Homathko area
Whitemantle Range Homathko area
Bendor Range
Garibaldi Ranges
Clendinning Range
Tantalus Range
Chilcotin Ranges
Dickson Range
Shulaps Range
Camelsfoot Range
Lillooet Ranges, (Fraser Canyon west bank)
Cantilever Range
Cayoosh Range
Douglas Ranges
Front Ranges (North Shore Mountains)
Insular Mountains, British Columbia
Vancouver Island Ranges, British Columbia
Queen Charlotte Mountains, British Columbia
Olympic Mountains, Washington
Cascade Range, British Columbia (Fraser Canyon east bank), Washington, Oregon and California
Oregon Coast Range, Oregon
Northern Oregon Coast Range
Central Oregon Coast Range
Southern Oregon Coast Range
Calapooya Mountains, Oregon
Klamath-Siskiyou, Oregon, Northern California
Klamath Mountains, Oregon, Northern California
Siskiyou Mountains, Oregon, Northern California
Trinity Alps and Salmon Mountains, Northern California
Yolla Bolly Mountains, Northern California
Northern Coast Ranges, Northern California
King Range, Northern California
Mendocino Range, Northern California
Mayacamas Mountains, Northern California
Marin Hills, Northern California, (including Mount Tamalpais)
Central California Coast Ranges, Central California
Santa Cruz Mountains, Central California
Diablo Range, Central California
Gabilan Range, Central California
Santa Lucia Range, Central California
Temblor Range, Central California
Caliente Range, Central California
Transverse Ranges, Southern California
Sierra Madre Mountains, Southern California
Sierra Pelona Mountains, Southern California
San Emigdio Mountains, Southern California
San Rafael Mountains, Southern California
Santa Ynez Mountains, Southern California
Tehachapi Mountains, Southern California
Topatopa Mountains, Southern California
Santa Susana Mountains, Southern California
Simi Hills, Southern California
Santa Monica Mountains, Southern California
Chalk Hills, Southern California
San Gabriel Mountains, Southern California
San Rafael Hills, Southern California
Puente Hills, Southern California
San Bernardino Mountains, Southern California
Little San Bernardino Mountains, Southern California
Peninsular Ranges, Southern California and Mexico
Santa Ana Mountains, Southern California
Chino Hills, Southern California
San Jacinto Mountains, Southern California
Palomar Mountain Range, Southern California
Laguna Mountains, Southern California
Sierra Juarez, Northern Baja California, Mexico
Sierra San Pedro Martir, Central Baja California, Mexico
Sierra de San Borja, Central Baja California, Mexico 
Sierra de San Francisco, Central Baja California, Mexico 
Sierra de Guadalupe cave paintings, Central Baja California, Mexico 
Sierra de la Giganta, Southern Baja California, Mexico
Sierra de la Laguna, Southern Baja California, Mexico
Sierra Madre Occidental, Northwestern Mexico

Major icefields
These are not named as ranges, but amount to the same thing.  The Pacific Coast Ranges are home to the largest temperate-latitude icefields in the world.
Harding Icefield
Sargent Icefield
Bagley Icefield
Kluane Icefields
Juneau Icefield
Stikine Icecap
Ha-Iltzuk Icefield (Silverthrone Glacier)
Monarch Icefield
Waddington Icefield
Homathko Icefield
Lillooet Icecap (Lillooet Crown)
Pemberton Icefield

Only the largest icefields are listed above; smaller icefields may be listed on the various range pages.  Formally unnamed icefields are not listed

See also

 List of Pacific Coast Ranges topics
 Coast Range (ecoregion)
 California Coast Ranges (geomorphic province)
 Coast Ranges (geomorphic province)
 United States physiographic regions

References

 
Lists of mountain ranges of the United States
Mountain ranges of North America
North American Cordillera
Geology of North America
Geography of North America
Geography of the West Coast of the United States

Mountain ranges of Mexico
.
.
.
Physiographic provinces
Physiographic regions of Canada
Physiographic regions of Mexico
Physiographic regions of the United States